Bresso Airfield, also known as Aeroporto Giampiero Clerici, is an aerodrome in Bresso, in the Milan metropolitan area.

Originally built in 1912, the field served as a factory airfield until the nearby Breda factory expanded its production to military aircraft for World War I. From 1931 to 1933 it housed the Regia Aeronautica's Terzo Stormo. On April 30, 1944, the Breda factory and the airfield were heavily bombed by 53 American Boeing B-17. Seven aircraft and a few hangars went completely destroyed. At the end of World War II the airport was mostly used as a military flying training camp and to field fighter aircraft as part of the defence system of the city.

In 1960, it became the permanent site of the Aero Club Milano. Since then the airport mostly serves as a general aviation airfield for flying club activity, touristic flights and air taxi. It also hosts a base of the state helicopter emergency service Elisoccorso.

On June 3, 2012, on the occasion of the seventh World Meeting of Families promoted by the Catholic Church, Pope Benedict XVI celebrated a mass on the tarmac in front of a million of pilgrims.

Runway
It has a magnetic orientation (QFU) 36/18.

Frequencies
Bresso Radio 122.005
Milano Informazioni 124.925
Linate Tower 118.100
Milano Approach 126.300

References

Metropolitan City of Milan
Airports in Milan